Jordy Gaspar (born 23 April 1997) is a French professional footballer who plays as a full-back for Grenoble Foot 38. He has also represented the France national youth teams starting from the France national under-19 football team.

Club career

Lyon
Gaspar made his debut in the Champions League on 27 September 2016 against Sevilla. He played 71 minutes until being replaced by Rachid Ghezzal in a 1–0 away loss.

Monaco
Gaspar agreed to terms with Monaco for a three-year contract on 16 June 2017, after he was unable to agree on terms for a professional contract with Lyon.

Cercle Brugge (loan)
Gaspar was loaned to Cercle Brugge until the end of the 2017–18 season.

Personal life
Born in France, Gaspar is of Angolan descent. He is a youth international for France.

Career statistics

Club

References

External links
 

1997 births
Living people
People from Saint-Priest-en-Jarez
Association football defenders
French footballers
France youth international footballers
French expatriate sportspeople in Monaco
Expatriate footballers in Monaco
Olympique Lyonnais players
AS Monaco FC players
Cercle Brugge K.S.V. players
Grenoble Foot 38 players
Ligue 1 players
Ligue 2 players
Challenger Pro League players
French people of Angolan descent
Expatriate footballers in Belgium
Sportspeople from Loire (department)
Footballers from Auvergne-Rhône-Alpes